Ganorhynchus is an extinct genus of prehistoric lungfish from the Devonian period. It is only found in Mansfield, Pennsylvania.

References 

Prehistoric lungfish genera
Devonian bony fish
Devonian fish of North America